"Aku Memilih Setia" is a song performed by singer Fatin Shidqia. It is her debut single  and featured on her debut album titled For You was released in November 2013. The single was released in Indonesia on 17 May 2013.

Background

During a performance in Grand Final of the first season of X Factor Indonesia on 17 May 2013, finalist who made to Finale will sing their winner song. Fatin and Novita Dewi advanced to The Finale beating Nu Dimension to elimination. Fatin for the first time would sing her song "Aku Memilih Setia" in the end of the show. The single was released digitally via iTunes on 17 May 2013.
The track was released on 600 radio all around Indonesia on 31 May 2013.

Music videos

On 11 June 2013, Fatin said that the music video for the single had been filmed. The video was filmed in Depok, West Java. The video was filmed at the Zoe Cafe & Library, Margonda Street. In the music video, Fatin wore a light brown dress. The video was about a girl who was dating with a book store keeper, and the girl always comes there as she had fallen in love with the boy deeply. But as his boss knew that he was dating the girl, he was fired. The girl returns to her ex-boyfriend and chooses to be faithful.
On 28 June 2013,music video "Aku Memilih Setia" for the first time was premiered in Concert Super X on RCTI.

Live performances

The track was performed live for the first time on 17 May 2013 at Grand Final and on 24 May 2013 at The Result of the first season of X Factor Indonesia. On 28 May 2013 on Hitam Putih. Fatin Shidqia performed the song on Anugerah Musik Indonesia 2013 on 2 July 2013. Other appearances will include on 5 July 2013 on Satu Jam Lebih Dekat on "TvOne". On 24 August 2013 on X Factor Around the World, Fatin performed "Aku Memilih Setia" on her solo performance. and Fatin sung at many Music Show like Dahsyat and 100% Ampuh.

Track listing

Awards and nominations

Chart performance

References

External links
 Lyrics Aku Memilih Setia by Fatin Shidqia

2013 debut singles
2013 songs
Sony Music singles
X Factor Indonesia